Redoak is an unincorporated community in Brown County, in the U.S. state of Ohio.

History
A post office called Red Oak was established in 1865, and remained in operation until 1903. Besides the post office, Redoak had several country stores.

References

Unincorporated communities in Brown County, Ohio
1865 establishments in Ohio
Unincorporated communities in Ohio